Samudrapur is a town and the headquarters of Samudrapur tehsil in Hinganghat subdivision of Wardha district in Nagpur revenue Division in the Vidarbha region in the state of Maharashtra, India. Jamb town is located in Samudrapur tehsil.

Demographics

References

Cities and towns in Wardha district
Talukas in Maharashtra